Adam Burke is a stand-up comedian, writer, and comic artist in the United States, best known for multiple appearances as a panelist on the National Public Radio comedy news program Wait Wait... Don't Tell Me!

Early life 
Born in Australia and raised in Northern Ireland, Burke currently lives in Chicago, Illinois.

Career

Stand-up comedy 
Adam Burke began his stand-up comedy career after his research for an article on the Chicago stand-up comedy scene for Chicago Social magazine led him to do an open mic night himself.  Early gigs included co-hosting a Wednesday night open mic with Cameron Esposito at Cole's Bar in Chicago, Illinois.  His influences include Spike Milligan, Bill Hicks and Steve Martin.

Burke was voted Best Standup by readers of The Chicago Reader in 2014, and won Second City's Up Next Comedy Competition.

He has performed in comedy festivals such as the Bridgetown Comedy Festival in Portland Oregon, Just for Laughs Chicago, and Funny Or Die's Oddball Comedy Festival.  He has opened for comedians including Marc Maron, Jeff Ross, Hannibal Burress, John Mulaney, Hari Kondabolu, Maria Bamford, Michael Ian Black, Kumail Nanjiani, John Oliver, Tracy Morgan and Aziz Ansari.

Film and television 
In addition to performing, Burke was a writer for the local television comedy show Man of the People with Pat Tomasulo that aired on WGN-TV from 2018 to 2019.

He currently hosts the YouTube series The 5 O'clock Somewhere News with Comedian Adam Burke.

Radio and podcast 
Burke is a regular panelist for NPR's Wait Wait... Don't Tell Me!

Burke has appeared on several podcasts and radio shows including Doug Loves Movies, The Benson Interruption, The Bob & Tom Show, and Put Your Hands Together with Cam & Rhea.

Comedy albums 
Burke released his debut album Universal Squirrel Theory on A Special Thing Records in 2012.

Comics 
Burke is the creator of the webcomic The Grimbles (published from 2001 to 2005), and Diabolica (published from 2000 to 2001).

References

External links 
 

1976 births
Living people
21st-century American comedians